Eric Marques (24 April 1919 – 22 June 1976) was a Brazilian modern pentathlete. He competed at the 1951 Pan American Games and the 1952 Summer Olympics.

References

External links
 

1919 births
1976 deaths
Brazilian male modern pentathletes
Olympic modern pentathletes of Brazil
Modern pentathletes at the 1952 Summer Olympics
Pan American Games medalists in modern pentathlon
Modern pentathletes at the 1951 Pan American Games
Medalists at the 1951 Pan American Games
Pan American Games gold medalists for Brazil
20th-century Brazilian people